XHIZM-FM is a noncommercial cultural radio station on 88.9 FM in Izúcar de Matamoros, Puebla, Mexico, known as La Revolucionaria.

History
On September 6, 2013, Fundación General Francisco Hernández Domínguez, A.C., applied for a new permit FM station at Izúcar de Matamoros. The application was approved by the Federal Telecommunications Institute on November 28, 2018. XHIZM-FM signed on November 18, 2019.

References

Radio stations in Puebla
2019 establishments in Mexico
Radio stations established in 2019